A list of historical events that took place in China in the year 1880.

Incumbents 
 Guangxu Emperor (6th year)
 Regent: Empress Dowager Cixi

Viceroys
 Viceroy of Zhili — Li Hongzhang
 Viceroy of Min-Zhe — He Jing (何璟)
 Viceroy of Huguang — Li Hanzhang
 Viceroy of Shaan-Gan 
 Zuo Zongtang 
 Yang Changjun
 Viceroy of Liangguang 
 Yukuan (裕寬) – through 20 May 1880 (acting)
 Zhang Shusheng
 Viceroy of Yun-Gui — Liu Changyou
 Viceroy of Sichuan — Ding Baozhen

Events
 Muslim women are forbidden to marry non-Muslims in Islamic law

Establishments 
 Chefoo School

Births 

 Chen Yuan (historian), (1880–1971) historian and educator
 He Peirong (何佩瑢;  1880 – 1942) was a military personnel and politician in the Republic of China. He belonged to the Beijing Government, Anhui clique.
 Bin Bucheng (賓步程;  1880- 1943) politician and educator, became the President of Hunan University
 Wan Fulin (Wan Fulin (Chinese: 万福麟; 1880–1951) the military governor of Heilongjiang province from 1928 and part of the Fengtian clique
 Zhu Xingyuan (Chinese: 祝惺元; born 1880-1945?) was a politician and diplomat in the Republic of China. He was an important politician during the Provisional Government of the Republic of China and the Wang Jingwei regime
 Jia Deyao (賈德耀; 1880–1940) was a Chinese military commander and politician, member of the Anhui clique during the Beiyang Government.
 Leong Sin Nam 梁燊南(1880–1940) was a Malaysian businessman

Deaths 
 Ng Akew, Chinese opium smuggler and house owner in Hong Kong